Lalinde is a French commune. 

Lalinde may also refer to:

 Canal de Lalinde, France
 Canton of Lalinde, France
 Lalinde station, a railway station in the commune
 Julián Lalinde (born 1985), Uruguayan retired footballer